Statistics of Czechoslovak First League in the 1936–37 season.

Overview
It was contested by 12 teams, and Slavia Prague won the championship. František Kloz was the league's top scorer with 28 goals.

League standings

Results

Top goalscorers

References

Czechoslovakia - List of final tables (RSSSF)

Czechoslovak First League seasons
1936–37 in Czechoslovak football
Czech